Gregory Joseph Burke (born November 8, 1959) is an American journalist. He was formerly the director of the Holy See Press Office, a position in which he succeeded Federico Lombardi, and was succeeded by Matteo Bruni. 

Burke was formerly a correspondent for the Fox News and for Time magazine, while based in Rome. In June 2012 it was announced he would be taking up the position of senior communications advisor for the Section for General Affairs of the Vatican's Secretariat of State.

He was appointed vice director of the Holy See Press Office in December 2015, and was promoted to director August 1, 2016. On December 31, 2018, he announced his intention to resign his appointment. In September 2019 he became director of communications at IESE Business School.

Personal life
Burke is from St. Louis, Missouri. He is a graduate of St. Louis University High School and the Columbia University School of Journalism. He is a member of Opus Dei.

References

1959 births
Living people
Mass media in Vatican City
American television journalists
Columbia University Graduate School of Journalism alumni
People from St. Louis
Fox News people
Opus Dei members
Roman Catholic activists
American expatriates in Italy
American male journalists
Catholics from Missouri
Journalists from Missouri
20th-century American journalists
21st-century American journalists